Maurice John Talbot was Dean of Limerick from  1954 to 1971.

He was born on 29 March 1912 into an ecclesiastical family, the second son of the Very Rev. Joseph Talbot, Dean of Cashel, and was educated at St Columba's College and Trinity College, Dublin. He was ordained in 1936  and after a curacy in Nantenan he held  incumbencies at Rathkeale and then Killarney before his elevation to the Deanery.

He died 17 June 1999.

Notes

1912 births
1999 deaths
People educated at St Columba's College, Dublin
Alumni of Trinity College Dublin
Deans of Limerick
20th-century Irish Anglican priests